

 
Bynoe is a locality in the Northern Territory of Australia located about  south-west of the territorial capital of Darwin.

Bynoe consists of land in the cadastral unit of the Hundred of Milne with exception of the part of the hundred located south of the Finniss River.  It is named after the Bynoe Harbour whose coastline forms its northern boundary.  It also includes part of the subdivision known as "Milne Inlet".  Its boundaries and name were gazetted on 4 April 2007. 

The Fog Bay Road passes throughout the locality from the Cox Peninsula Road in the east.

The 2016 Australian census which was conducted in August 2016 reports that Bynoe had 96 people living within its boundaries.

Bynoe is located within the federal division of Lingiari, the territory electoral division of Daly and within the unincorporated areas of the Northern Territory.

References
 

 Populated places in the Northern Territory
Places in the unincorporated areas of the Northern Territory